Nikki Phillips my refer to:

 Nikki Phillips (model) (born 1983), New Zealand model
 Nikki Phillips (soccer) (born 1987), Polish-American footballer